Robert Zero Karl Oskar Broberg (2 July 1940 – 21 July 2015) was a Swedish singer, composer and artist. As an artist, he used various names: Robban or Robban Broberg (1957–1968), Robert Karl-Oskar Broberg (1968–1974), Zero (1974–1982) and, starting in 1982, Robert Broberg, the name he used until his death.

Career
When Broberg studied at Konstfack in 1957, he claimed that he had a skiffle group and later he was invited to play with his skiffle group at the dance restaurant Lorry in Sundbyberg. Then he quickly collected friends and they started rehearsing. Later he started writing own songs.

In 1989 he received "Karamelodiktstipendiet". He died from Parkinson's disease on 21 July 2015 at the age of 75.

Discography

Albums

1967: 7 bitar Robban + 7 bitar Broberg
2015: Text & Musik

Singles

Songs written
(Selective)
Carola
Ingela
Uppblåsbara Barbara
Likbil
Båtlåt
Öken
Maria-Therese
1983 års ängel
Lajla 1
Vatten
Alla springer omkring
Sitting Bull
Om kärleken var statsminister
Pappa se min hand
Vinna med min kvinna
Får jag doppa min mjukglass i din strössel

Bibliography
Dej ska vi lura... (1968)
Robert Brobergs galleri finns de' inga galler i (1992)
Gilla läget! (2003)

Filmography
1965: 4 x 4 – Frank Citter
1968: Längta efter kärlek – Bosse
1981: Kom igen nu'rå! (TV Short) – Pelle
1982: Kan tigrar få ägg? (TV Short) – Totte
1987: Ree Pete and the Windshieldwipers (TV Movie) – Ree Pete
1988: Go'natt Herr Luffare (Short) – Pappa (final film role)

References

External links
Official website

  with Roxette's Marie Fredriksson

1940 births
2015 deaths
People from Solna Municipality
Swedish artists
Swedish male singers
Swedish composers
Swedish male composers
Deaths from Parkinson's disease
Neurological disease deaths in Sweden